

History
Hardliner was a Canadian hard rock band from St. John's, Newfoundland & Labrador that formed in 1999. The band performed at St. John's music venues and released a six-song EP, entitled 'Generation Why?' in 2001. The band had interviews on Canada's CBC Radio, as well as interviews and live footage aired on MuchMusic's programme Going Coastal.

Hardliner was active from 1999-2004, at which time the band went on an indefinite hiatus. Hardliner reunited in 2009 to play some live shows, and then went back on hiatus in late-2010.

Discography

2009-2010 lineup
 John Nolan - vocals (2000–2003, 2009–2010)
 Dan Moore - guitar (2000–2003, 2009–2010)
 Brad Dooley - guitar (2009–2010)
 Paul Gruchy - bass (1999–2004, 2009–2010)
 Doug Rowe - drums (1999–2004, 2009–2010)

Former members
 Mike Gruchy - vocals (1999, 2003–2004)
 Daryl Downey - vocals (2000)
 Darren Ford - guitar (1999–2000)
 Steve Kennedy - guitar (2001–2004)
 Craig Pardy - guitar (2003–2004)

Timeline

Musical groups established in 1999
Musical groups disestablished in 2004
Musical groups reestablished in 2009
Canadian hard rock musical groups
1999 establishments in Canada
2004 disestablishments in Newfoundland and Labrador